Edward "Ed" Colligan (born March 4, 1961) is a former president and CEO of Palm, Inc. which was acquired by Hewlett-Packard in 2010. Colligan now is a small business investor, serves on a number of boards, and advises start-up companies.
 
Colligan was president and COO of Handspring prior to the Palm/Handspring merger in 2003. Before Handspring, he led the marketing campaign at Palm, Inc. that launched the Palm family of PDAs and smartphones. Earlier in his career, he served as vice president of strategic and product marketing for Radius Corporation. 
He graduated in 1983 with a bachelor's degree in political science from the University of Oregon.

In March 2022, Colligan joined the renewable energy asset management company Low Carbon as Head of Americas.

References 

1961 births
American computer businesspeople
Living people
Palm, Inc.
University of Oregon alumni
Private equity and venture capital investors
Place of birth missing (living people)
Businesspeople from the San Francisco Bay Area
20th-century American businesspeople